Valliculture is an ancient fish culture practice originated in the Mediterranean region namely the Adriatic and Tyrrhenian coasts. People exploit the seasonal migrations of some fish species from the sea into the lagoons by preventing the fish returning to the sea. The term now applies to fish culture in coastal lagoons or brackish water bodies based on seasonal migrations of fish.

See also
 Aquaculture

References

External links
FAO valliculture
Eel farming

Fish farming